Lee Lim-saeng (born November 18, 1971) is a former South Korean footballer who played as a defender.

Playing career 
Lee mostly played his club career for Bucheon SK, and won three Korean League Cups. He also played for South Korean national team at the 1998 FIFA World Cup.

Managerial career 
Lee was appointed head coach of Singaporean club Home United in 2010. The club finished the S.League twice as runners-up, and won the Singapore Cup twice. On 5 December 2014, he resigned their head coach.

Career statistics

Club

Honours

Player 
Bucheon SK
Korean League Cup: 1994, 1996, 2000+

South Korea U20
AFC Youth Championship: 1990

South Korea B
Summer Universiade silver medal: 1993

Individual
K League 1 Best XI: 1998, 2000

Manager 
Home United
Singapore Cup: 2011, 2013

Suwon Samsung Bluewings
Korean FA Cup: 2019

Individual
Korean FA Cup Best Manager: 2019

Notes

References

External links
 
 Lee Lim-saeng at KFA 
 
 

1971 births
Living people
Sportspeople from Incheon
South Korean footballers
Association football defenders
Korea University alumni
Jeju United FC players
Busan IPark players
K League 1 players
South Korea under-20 international footballers
South Korea under-23 international footballers
Olympic footballers of South Korea
South Korea international footballers
Footballers at the 1992 Summer Olympics
Footballers at the 1996 Summer Olympics
1998 FIFA World Cup players
2000 CONCACAF Gold Cup players
South Korean football managers
Home United FC head coaches
Shenzhen F.C. managers
Incheon United FC managers
K League 1 managers
Singapore Premier League head coaches
Chinese Super League managers
South Korean expatriate football managers
South Korean expatriate sportspeople in Singapore
South Korean expatriate sportspeople in China
Expatriate football managers in Singapore
Expatriate football managers in China
Footballers at the 1994 Asian Games
Asian Games competitors for South Korea